Romeos is a 2011 German tragicomedy film.  The film was written and directed by Sabine Bernardi.  It was released on December 8, 2011.  Prior to its release, the film's screenplay won the Best Treatment Cologne Screenplay Prize in 2007.

Plot

The film is a drama and tragicomedy which revolves around the romantic relationship between Lukas, a 20-year-old gay trans man, and a cisgender gay man named Fabio. Lukas is in the midst of his transition. After joining the gay scene in Cologne, Lukas meets an attractive bad boy named Fabio and an attraction develops between the two men. Lukas is faced with the choice of revealing his identity to Fabio and risking losing everything.

See also
 List of lesbian, gay, bisexual or transgender-related films

References

External links
 
 
 
 
 Film review for Romeos

2011 LGBT-related films
2011 romantic comedy-drama films
2011 films
Films shot in Cologne
Gay-related films
German romantic comedy-drama films
2010s German-language films
German LGBT-related films
LGBT-related comedy-drama films
Tragicomedy films
Films about trans men
2011 directorial debut films
2011 drama films
2010s German films